Book of Bad Decisions is the twelfth studio album by American rock band Clutch, released on September 7, 2018, through the band's own label Weathermaker Music. It was released on CD, regular black vinyl, limited coke bottle clear vinyl and on picture disc, and was produced by Vance Powell.

Reception

MetalSucks praised the album, calling it a "slightly disjointed record that sounds like the simmering undercurrent of disbelief, anxiety, and rage that lies just below the surface of the world today." Rolling Stone was also positive in their review, stating "Book of Bad Decisions is another solid latter-day Clutch record, bathed in the grit and liberal fuzz tone that have made their live shows legendary." Exclaim! gave the album a 9/10, stating that "this really needs to be said more, but Clutch are one of the best rock acts of the modern era".

Track listing
All songs written by Clutch.

Personnel 
Clutch
 Neil Fallon – vocals, rhythm guitar
 Tim Sult – lead guitar
 Dan Maines – bass
 Jean-Paul Gaster – drums

Additional personnel
 Chris Brooks – Hammond B3, wurlitzer and piano on "Book of Bad Decisions", "In Walks Barbarella", "Emily Dickinson", "Sonic Counselor", "Vision Quest" and "Hot Bottom Feeder"
 Mike Dillon – percussion, vibraphone on "In Walks Barbarella", "Hot Bottom Feeder", "Book of Bad Decisions" and "Lorelei"
 Kevin Gatzke – tenor, baritone saxophone and horn arrangement on "In Walks Barbarella"
 Vinnie Ciesielski – trumpet
 Roy Agee – trombone and bass trombone

Technical personnel 
 Vance Powell – production, engineering and mixing
 Michael Fahey – production assistant
 Paul Logus – mastering

Charts

References

Clutch (band) albums
2018 albums